Zakaria Benchaâ (born 11 January 1997) is an Algerian professional footballer who plays as a forward.

Club career

MC Oran
Benchaâ is born in Oran. He started career with MC Oran in youth categories. In 2014, he joined the A team of the club.

USM Alger
On March 23, 2018 Zakaria Benchaâ joined to USM Alger for three seasons. He made his debut for the team in the Arab Club Champions Cup during a win against Al-Quwa Al-Jawiya. On August 14, He made his debut in the Ligue 1 against DRB Tadjenanet as a substitute and scored his first goal in 3–1 victory. Benchaâ suffered from injuries that kept him from glowing as he finished the season early and only played seven matches. In the following season, after getting rid of the injury, Benchaâ starred greatly in the CAF Champions League, where he scored five goals. including a brace against AS Sonidep and Gor Mahia. in transfers winter 2019–20 Benchaâ left for Tunisian club CS Sfaxien on Loan for six months with purchase option. After a long wait due to the closure of the borders, Benchaâ returned to Algeria, Antar Yahia the sporting director of USM Alger declared that Benchaâ has good capabilities and that he will train with the Reserve team, and if his mentality does not match the team he will not be in the club's squad.

CS Sfaxien
On January 30, 2020, Benchaâ joined Tunisian club CS Sfaxien on Loan for six months. After joining, he suffered an injury that kept him out of the field for months, and his first match was against CA Bizertin On August 9, 2020. His first goal was against US Ben Guerdane when Benchaâ scored a double in 4–0 victory. Due to COVID-19 pandemic, the loan was extended to September 30 until the end of the Tunisian championship, after an agreement between the two clubs. As a reminder, the two clubs had a different in this file, last August. The Tunisians had threatened to seize the Tunisian Football Federation (FTF) and FIFA for the activation of the purchase option.
On September 25, 2020, Benchaâ returned to USM Alger.

International career

Career statistics

Club

Honours

Club
 USM Alger
 Algerian Ligue Professionnelle 1 (1): 2018–19

References

External links
 
 NFT Profile

1997 births
Living people
Footballers from Oran
Algerian footballers
Algeria international footballers
Algerian Ligue Professionnelle 1 players
First Professional Football League (Bulgaria) players
MC Oran players
USM Alger players
PFC Cherno More Varna players
Algerian expatriate footballers
Expatriate footballers in Bulgaria
Association football forwards
21st-century Algerian people